Yan Petrovich Gaylit (May 25, 1894 – August 1, 1938) was a Soviet Komkor of Latvian ethnicity. He fought in the Imperial Russian Army in World War I before going over to the Bolsheviks in the subsequent civil war. He was a recipient of the Order of the Red Banner. During the Great Purge, as a part of the so-called "Latvian Operation", Gaylit was arrested by the NKVD on August 15, 1937 and executed the following year. 

He was rehabilitated in 1956.

Sources
 Латышские стрелки

Bibliography
 
 

1894 births
1938 deaths
People from Valmiera
People from Kreis Wolmar
Soviet komkors
Imperial Russian Army officers
Russian military personnel of World War I
Soviet military personnel of the Russian Civil War
Recipients of the Order of the Red Banner
Great Purge victims from Latvia
People executed by the Soviet Union by firearm
Soviet rehabilitations